Delilah Rene (born February 15, 1960, in North Bend, Oregon) is an American radio personality, author, and songwriter, best known as the host of a nationally syndicated nightly U.S. radio song request and dedication program, with an estimated 8 million listeners. She first aired in the Seattle market as Delilah Rene, though she is now known simply as Delilah.

Early life
In 1969, Delilah's family moved from Coos Bay, Oregon, to neighboring Reedsport, where she attended school. In 1974, she won a middle-school speech contest judged by owners of the local AM radio station. Delilah began her radio career there, at KDUN in Reedsport, doing school reports. She soon was creating advertising spots and then was given her own time slot during shifts before and after school. After graduating from high school in 1978, she worked at numerous stations in Oregon and in Seattle before creating the format she became known for at KLSY in 1984.

Radio show

Format
The show, known simply as Delilah, begins at 7 p.m. and ends around midnight local time. She takes calls from listeners in her home studio, providing encouragement, support, and receiving musical dedication requests. It is based in the Pacific Northwest.

One of the cornerstones of the show is its use of callers. Most of the time the caller tells Delilah her situation or story and then Delilah chooses the song that she feels best matches the caller's situation. Callers are recorded during the show and replayed later, sometimes within the hour. Delilah also plays songs by direct request.

Originally heard only on weeknights, stations that carry the show have the option of carrying it six or even seven nights a week, with most stations airing at least one night of the weekend (usually Sunday) in addition to a weeknight show.

Adult contemporary (AC): This is the most widely distributed version of the show between January and early November. It airs the usual adult contemporary music and is geared towards adults and their families. This is the version heard on most radio stations. It has also surfaced on hot adult contemporary stations.  Maroon 5, Pink, Adele, Kelly Clarkson, Katy Perry, and many other music artists and groups are heard in this version.
Gold-based AC: A version of the show that features several older adult contemporary hits, from artists including Elton John, Michael Bublé, Whitney Houston, Celine Dion and others.
Christmas music: This is the only version that is produced between mid-November (a few weeks after Halloween) and Christmas. It features all Christmas music, mainly because most of the adult contemporary music formatted stations that carry the show switch over to the format for only two months. Stations that do not switch to Christmas music at that time can receive the main version of the show.
Christian Music version: A version of the show featuring Contemporary Christian music, specifically produced for stations and audiences favoring this genre.

The show includes "Friday Nite Girls", a "fan club"-style feature in which she honors groups of her regular female listeners with prizes. She occasionally also calls certain "Friday Nite Girls" chapters and speaks with them live on the air. She also airs a "Delilah Dilemma" each evening in the first and third hours of the broadcast.

Distribution
The program debuted on four stations at the beginning of 1996, finishing the year on a dozen stations.  In 1997, Broadcast Programming started to distribute the program, which was later bought by Jones Radio Networks. Delilah moved to Premiere Radio Networks in 2004, where she remains to this day. There are nearly 170 radio stations, and the Armed Forces Radio Network, airing the program. Jane Bulman is the original executive producer and has been in that role for 20 years.

Many of the stations carrying the show are owned by Premiere parent iHeartMedia. In November 2006, WLTW in New York began carrying her.  The version of the show that runs on WLTW is a separate, specially tailored version of the show produced just for that station, with music programmed by local WLTW Programming. In 2007, longtime lovesongs host Zoe Bonet was dropped from KODA Houston and replaced with her. In March 2012, she went on the air in Los Angeles on KFSH-FM, a Salem Broadcasting owned station playing Christian music. This addition debuted the Christian Music formatted version of the program. iHeartRadio has an online Delilah stream where listeners can hear the show all the time regardless of time zone or broadcast market. Delilah is also on the air at WYJB (B95.5FM), a radio station in Albany, New York in the evening for listeners coming home from work on the weekdays or on the weekends.

In October 2017, Delilah temporarily went on hiatus after the suicide of one of her children.

On January 26, 2018, Seattle soft AC station KSWD announced that Delilah would host middays on the station beginning January 29. The station also picked up her syndicated show for Friday, Saturday, and Sunday nights.

In 2021, Rene purchased KDUN in her hometown of Reedsport, Oregon, which carries her syndicated show.

Audience
The show is popular among women between the ages of 25 and 54. As many as eight million people tune in to listen to the program throughout the full week.

According to a Bloomberg interview, Delilah has seen her reported audience numbers plummet in cities where Nielsen Audio has adopted the Portable People Meter for tracking listenership.

In popular culture
The show plays a role in the Hallmark Channel television series Cedar Cove, which is based on writer Debbie Macomber's book series and set in a fictional Pacific coast town in Washington state. Quotes and other inspirational pieces voiced by Delilah especially for the series set up some of the plot devices which occur in the course of each episode.

The show can also be heard in the 2018 film I Can Only Imagine, the biographical story of MercyMe lead singer Bart Millard.

Personal life
Delilah is a mother of 15 children, 11 of whom were adopted. Two of her children have died: a 16-year-old son, Sammy Young Dzolali Rene, died on March 12, 2012, of complications of sickle-cell anemia which had gone untreated most of his life until he was adopted by Delilah and brought to the US just 9 months before his death. On October 3, 2017, her 18-year-old biological son Zachariah died by suicide, following a brief, but intense period of depression.

Delilah has been married four times, and frequently jokes about, and refers to, her multiple divorces on her show. She is currently married to her longtime pal Paul Warner. The two were married at her home on October 27, 2012. The invited guests (and most of the staff) were told only that they were attending her annual Harvest party.

She lives near Port Orchard, Washington.

Awards and honors

Books

References

External links

1960 births
Living people
American radio personalities
People from Reedsport, Oregon
Radio personalities from Seattle
American Christians
People from North Bend, Oregon
People from Port Orchard, Washington
People from Coos Bay, Oregon